The UbiArt Framework is a 2.5D video game engine developed by Ubisoft Montpellier. Its function is to organize 2D animated vector graphics into a playable video game without extensive coding.

History 
In 2010, Ubisoft announced Rayman Origins, first an episodic video game designed by Michel Ancel and developed by a small team of five people, but it was announced that it transformed into a full game. The title uses the UbiArt Framework developed by Ubisoft Montpellier and Ancel. UbiArt is a developer platform that allows artists and animators to easily create content and use it in an interactive environment. The engine is optimized for HD resolutions and is capable of running games at 60 frames per second in resolutions exceeding 1080p.

Ancel has expressed his desire for the framework to be available for anybody to develop games with. However, no public release or licensing option has been made available.

On April 9, 2019, in an interview with IGN, Yves explained why the engine was not being used as initially planned and explains that the "tools were difficult to use". The plan was to distribute the engine to other studios with Guillemot saying "at one point we wanted to give them to everybody [in Ubisoft].” However, they decided not to as they wanted to “spend a lot of time with a lot of people to actually help people to use it.” But the engine is not abandoned as Guillemot explained “It’s still there, and you will see other things using it, but it’s not as predominant as it used to be”, meaning the engine hasn't been forgotten.

Games developed with UbiArt Framework

References

Ubisoft
Video game engines